Tonna cumingi, common name Cuming's tun,  is a species of very large sea snail, a tun snail, a marine gastropod mollusc in the family Tonnidae, the tuns.

Taxonomy
The species currently referred to as Tonna cumingii (Hanley in Reeve, 1849) was referred to as:
 Tonna canaliculata (Linnaeus, 1758) by Thach (2005:91, pl. 23, fig. 5)
 Tonna cumingii 'Reeve' by (a. o.) Hedley (1919:331); Winckworth & Tomlin (1933:209); Hinton (1977:26); Powell (1979:161); Kilburn (1986:4); Thach (2005:91)
The species currently referred to as Tonna chinensis (Dillwyn, 1817) was referred to as Tonna cumingii (Hanley in Reeve, 1849) by Springsteen & Leobrera (1986:100, pl. 26, fig. 2)

The species currently referred to as Tonna poppei Vos, 2005 was illustrated by Cernohorsky (1972:111); Hinton (1974:19, fig. 7; 1977:26 fig. 7a) and referred to as Tonna cumingii 'Reeve'

The species currently referred to as Tonna deshayesii (Reeve, 1849) was referred to as Tonna cumingii 'Reeve' by (a. o.) Powell (1979:61); Cernohorsky (1972:112)

Additional information on Cernohorsky (1972:111-112):
Whilst showing specimens of Tonna poppei Vos, 2005 on pl. 30, figs 5, Cernohorsky lists this species as Tonna cumingii (Reeve, 1849), with in synonymy: "Synonyms of T. cumingii are deshayesii Reeve, 1849, perselecta Iredale, 1931, and maoria Powell, 1938. Tonna magnifica (Sowerby III 1904) belongs either to T. cumingii or T. chinensis " (fide Cernohorsy, 1972:112)

Distribution
This species is found often off the southern coasts of India and Sri Lanka. Populations of animals with similar-looking shells from New Zealand and Australian waters have been assimilated into this species. Occasional records indicate a possible presence of the species in Philippine waters. Further study on this species should reveal its exact distribution. (Reference: Vos, 2007, A Conchological Iconography - Family Tonnidae)

Shell description
The shell height is up to 91 mm, and width up to 66 mm.

References

 Chris Vos and Alan Beu, 2007, A Conchological Iconography 13: The Family Tonnidae, ConchBooks,

External links
 Gastropods.com: Tonna (Chinensis complex) cumingii

Tonnidae
Gastropods of New Zealand
Gastropods described in 1849